Birmingham Midshires is an online trading name of Bank of Scotland plc (part of Lloyds Banking Group). It is headquartered at Pendeford Business Park, Wolverhampton. It previously had 67 branches throughout England and Wales. Previously, Birmingham Midshires was a building society, known as the Birmingham Midshires Building Society.

History
The Birmingham Midshires was formed in 1986 by the merger of the Birmingham and Bridgwater and the Midshires Building Societies. These societies could trace their roots back to 1849 and were themselves formed by the mergers of the following societies: Liverpool Building Society, Wolverhampton and Mercia, Bristol Equitable Permanent Benefit, Swansea & Gower Permanent, and the Warrington Workingmens' Permanent.

In 1999, the Birmingham Midshires Building Society agreed to a takeover bid from the Royal Bank of Scotland. However the deal collapsed when Halifax plc tabled a more lucrative offer. Halifax itself became a part of HBOS plc when it merged with the Bank of Scotland in 2001. In 2007, it became a division of Bank of Scotland plc following a reorganisation in the HBOS Group.

On 15 September 2005 Birmingham Midshires announced it was planning to close 48 of its 67 branches, through a phased programme concluding in March 2006, and the conversion of the remaining outlets to the Halifax brand. Customers were given the option of banking at their nearest Halifax branch and the 470 full and part-time BM employees were offered an alternative role at the company or within the wider Halifax branch network.

In 2008 HBOS plc was taken over by Lloyds Bank  and is now part of the newly formed Lloyds Banking Group.  Its main headquarters were rebranded as Lloyds following different sectors and work being moved to and from the site.

Products
Birmingham Midshires offers a range of specialist mortgage and savings products. When Birmingham Midshires became part of the Halifax in April 1999, it had savings balances of £5.9 billion and mortgage assets of £9.2 billion. BM savings balances have doubled since then to £12 billion; mortgage assets have more than trebled to over £32 billion. , Birmingham Midshires does not offer new products to new customers.

References

External links

 
 Birmingham Midshires merger history chart

Lloyds Banking Group
Bank of Scotland
Banks established in 1986
Banks of the United Kingdom
Companies based in Wolverhampton
1986 establishments in England